= Bhishma Raj Phulara =

Nepalese writer and lyricist

- भीष्मराज फुलारा
- Born: December 23, 1982 (age 43); Doti Nepal
- Occupations: Writer, Lyricist
- Writing career
- Language: Nepali
- Years active: 2011 - present
- Notable awards: National Shikhar Honar Award - 2019, Special Citizen Prizes - 2022

Bhishma Raj Phulara (Nepali: भीष्मराज फुलारा) born on December 23, 1982, is a Nepali novelist, lyricist, and documentary writer. He was born in the Doti district of Nepal. Known for his novel 'Tuhuro Kundali'. He made his authorial debut in 2010 AD with the novel 'Nafapeko Manche.' Additionally, he has been contributed as a lyricist to the Nepali Music Industry. 'Bhagya Bhitra' and 'Bhagya Bhitra Jiwan' being notable songs in his musical career. To date, he has published more than four novels. He has been honored from National Art Culture Music Awards 2077.

== Honor ==
| SN | Honor Title | Date | ref |
|---|---|---|---|
| 1 | National Epic Nepal Music Award 2075 | 2018AD | |
| 2 | National Art Culture Music Awards 2077 | 2020AD | |
| 3 | Mrs. Nepal Tourism 2019 | 2019AD | |
| 4 | Active Entertainment Pvt. Ltd. | 2021AD | |

== Novel ==
| SN | Novel Name | Published Date | ISBN | Ref |
|---|---|---|---|---|
| 1 | Tuhuro Kundali | 2010 AD | 978-9937-0-3133-2 | |
| 2 | Nafapeko Manche | 2011 AD | N/A | |
| 3 | Baashuda | 2022AD | 978-9937-1-1309-0 | |
| 4 | Orphan Horoscope | 2019 AD | 978-9937-0-3133-2 | |
| 5 | Nepali Bhasha ra sahityako Ithas | 2018AD | 987-9937-0-4819-4 | |

== Songs ==
| SN | Song name | Release date | Credit | ref |
|---|---|---|---|---|
| 1 | Kasto virus | 2020 | Lyricist | |
| 2 | Bhagya Bhitra Jiwan | 2021 | Lyricist | |
| 3 | Joon Sari | 2020 | Lyricist | |
| 4 | Ma Marebhane Yo Sahar | 2021 | Lyricist | |
| 5 | Saino Metai Gai | 2024 | Lyricist | |
| 6 | Aasu Piudai | 2022 | Lyricist | |
| 7 | Bhagya Bhitra Jiwan | 2021 | Lyricist | |

== Awards and nominations ==
| SN | Award Titile | Award Category | Notable Work | Result | Ref |
|---|---|---|---|---|---|
| 1 | Birat Music & Film Award-2021 | Popular Choice Award (Lyricist) | Yo Shankha ko Ghera | won | |
| 2 | PIM Nepal Film festival-2019 | Best Documentary Writer | - | | |
